Leonardo is a historical drama created by Frank Spotnitz and Steve Thompson. The series was produced by Italian Lux Vide in collaboration with Rai Fiction, Sony Pictures Entertainment, with Frank Spotnitz's Big Light Productions and Freddie Highmore's Alfresco Pictures in association with France Télévisions and RTVE.

The series recounts Leonardo da Vinci's extraordinary life through the works that made him famous and through the stories hidden within those works, revealing little by little the inner torments of a man obsessed with attaining perfection.

In March 2021, it was announced that Leonardo would return for a second season.

Plot
In 1506, Leonardo da Vinci, the most famous artist of his time, is accused of the murder of Caterina da Cremona. Questioned by Stefano Giraldi, an ambitious officer of the Duchy of Milan, Leonardo begins to tell his life, starting from the first meeting with Caterina in Andrea del Verrocchio's workshop. Giraldi, fascinated by the artist's personality, begins to suspect that Leonardo may be innocent and investigates to discover the truth.

Cast

Main 
Aidan Turner as Leonardo da Vinci.
 Matilda De Angelis as Caterina da Cremona (Leonardo's friend and muse).
 James D'Arcy as Ludovico Sforza, known as Il Moro (Duke of Milan).
 Alessandro Sperduti as Tommaso Masini (Leonardo's assistant).
 Gabriel Lo Giudice as Marco (Leonardo's assistant).
  as Giulio (Leonardo's assistant).
 Andrew Knott as Alfonso (Verrocchio's assistant).
 Massimo De Santis as Rinaldo Rossi (Giraldi's boss).
 Giancarlo Giannini as Andrea del Verrocchio (Leonardo's teacher).
 Freddie Highmore as Stefano Giraldi (Officer of the Duchy of Milan investigating the murder case in which Leonardo is involved).
 Carlos Cuevas as Salaì, nickname of Gian Giacomo Caprotti (Leonardo's assistant).
 Giovanni Scifoni as Luca Pacioli (Friar in Milan who urges Leonardo to paint L'Ultima Cena).
 Max Bennett as Cesare Borgia (Condottiero conquering Romagna).
  as Ramiro (Military commander under Cesare Borgia).
 Antonio De Matteo as Galeazzo Sanseverino (Military commander and right-hand man of Il Moro).

Recurring 

  as Bernardo Bembo (Venetian ambassador at the Duchy of Milan).
 Poppy Gilbert as Ginevra de' Benci (Amerigo's daughter and Leonardo's muse for her portrait).
 Miriam Dalmazio as Beatrice D’Este (Duchess of Milan and wife of Ludovico Sforza).
 Edan Hayhurst as Gian Galeazzo Sforza (Young Duke of Milan).
 Corrado Invernizzi as Pier Soderini (Gonfaloniere of the Republic of Florence and committent of Battaglia di Anghiari).
  as Niccolò Machiavelli.
 Maria Vera Ratti as Lisa del Giocondo (Leonardo's Muse for La Gioconda).
 Pierpaolo Spollon as Michelangelo Buonarroti.

Episodes

Broadcast
The series premiered on 23 March 2021 on Rai 1.
In the United Kingdom and Ireland, the series aired on Amazon Prime Video, premiering 16 April 2021. In India, the series premiered on SonyLIV on 9 April 2021. It aired in Canada on 15 April on Telus, while in Spain, on 3 June on RTVE. In March 2022, The CW picked up the series in the United States, and it premiered on 16 August 2022 as part of the network's summer programming slate in the 2021–22 television season.

Historical inaccuracies 
The producers openly declared that they had purposely moved away from historical reality to insert elements of fantasy, such as the story relating to the murder accusation of Leonardo and the character of Caterina da Cremona. Among the alterations to real events are:

Episodes 1 and 2 

 The first part of the series is set in 1490 (sixteen years before 1506) and Leonardo is shown as a pupil of Verrocchio. Actually Leonardo attended Verrocchio's workshop between 1468 and 1470, while in 1490 Verrocchio had already been dead for two years and Leonardo had his own shop.
 The process of mixing colors was among the first things that were taught to apprentices as soon as they entered a workshop, that is, as children. In the series an adult Leonardo is taught by his master this procedure for the first time, although Leonardo himself had already secretly painted with colours a few scenes before.
 Leonardo, who is initially shown to be little appreciated by Verrocchio, had actually already collaborated with him well before the Baptism of Christ. In the painting Tobias and the Angel – which can be seen in the background of the master's studio – the details of the dog and fish have been recognised as Leonardo's production.
 It was not Ludovico il Moro who went to Florence to ask for Leonardo's services; it was instead Leonardo himself who in 1482 moved to Milan, sent by Lorenzo the Magnificent as a lyre player and who presented Ludovico a sort of "curriculum" by letter.
 Amerigo de 'Benci, Ginevra's father, was already dead at the time Leonardo began her portrait, and for this reason he could not be the one who mutilated the lower part of the painting. It was probably curtailed in the next centuries because the hands were irremediably worn. Ginevra herself had also been married for at least a year to Luigi Niccolini (1474) when the portrait was commissioned.
 Although the memory of the kite is true, as told by Leonardo himself, it does not appear that the latter was ever considered cursed, neither as a newborn nor as an adult.
 Bernardo Bembo was actually ambassador in Florence in 1475 under the doge Pietro Mocenigo and in 1478 under the doge Giovanni Mocenigo. In the series he presents himself instead as ambassador in Milan: in accordance with his office, he would have had the duty to reside in Milan, while we initially find it in Florence. Under the dogate of Agostino Barbarigo, whom he named at the beginning, Bernardo held other positions not in Florence.
 Bernardo Bembo at the time of Ginevra's portrait (1474–1478) was a man in his forties, married to Elena Marcello and father of five children (including the famous humanist Pietro Bembo), while in the series he is said to be still unmarried.
 It does not appear that Piero da Vinci ever harboured hatred towards his son Leonardo; on the contrary, he welcomed him into his family and managed to guarantee him a future by sending him to a workshop.

Episodes 3 and 4 

 Duke Gian Galeazzo declares to Leonardo that he detests hunting. Actually, it is historically documented that his greatest passion was precisely hunting.
 During a court dinner we see the dukes and their courtiers eating with their hands, despite forks having already been in use in Italy for a long time. On the other hand, this was not the case in the rest of Europe: the French and the king of France himself were criticized by the Italians as uncivilized for their habit of eating with their hands.
 "King Louis of France" is mentioned as responsible for the plot against Ludovico Sforza, but the event clearly takes place before 1496, when the king of France was still Charles VIII. There was also never any attempt by Louis d'Orleáns to poison Ludovico Sforza.
 Salaì is presented in the series as a young thief and vagabond, while in reality he entered Leonardo's workshop as an apprentice at the age of ten in 1490 and was later defined as a "thief" by Leonardo himself because of his numerous pranks and of the petty thefts he carried out.
 The series suggests that Ludovico Sforza used to mistreat his wife Beatrice d'Este. Actually, from the sources of the time, it appears that it was Duke Gian Galeazzo who beat his wife Isabella of Aragon, while no such act is attributable to Ludovico.
 Gian Galeazzo died at the age of twenty-five in 1494 and not as a child as shown in the series.

Episodes 5 and 6 

 The childbirth of Beatrice d'Este was substantially different way than as shown in the series. Indeed, Beatrice probably had a premature labour, giving birth to a son already dead and dying in turn an hour and a half later, while in the series it is implied that the child is not born at all. Furthermore, at that time the management of pregnancy and childbirth was the sole responsibility of the midwives, while doctors hardly ever intervened and men were not allowed into the delivery room. Beatrice herself had her own personal midwife, comare Frasina da Ferrara, who assisted her during her three childbirths.
 Although it is true that Ludovico Sforza, destroyed by the death of his wife, focused since that moment exclusively on the embellishment of Santa Maria delle Grazie, the Last Supper was commissioned to Leonardo long before the death of Beatrice d'Este, i.e. in 1494.
 The conquest of the Duchy of Milan was entrusted by King Louis XII to the famous leader Gian Giacomo Trivulzio, and not to Cesare Borgia as shown in the series.
 Lisa Gherardini declares to mourn for the death of her newborn daughter of only six months. Actually it was not the custom in the fifteenth century to mourn for children who died as babies, as it was done instead for parents or other important personalities, since infant mortality was extremely high.
 Guidobaldo da Montefeltro declares to Cesare Borgia that he has a son, but he actually never had children, and was instead accused of impotence.

Episodes 7 and 8 

 Ludovico Sforza had numerous surviving children, including the two legitimate ones he had from Beatrice d'Este and at least three of the illegitimate ones. The existence of Francesco (son of Caterina da Cremona) would not therefore have been a problem for him - indeed in the Renaissance every bastard son was a source of pride - nor would the French have had the opportunity or reason to use him against Ludovico to "claim the kingdom". Rather, it was Louis XII himself who claimed the Duchy of Milan as his own possession, being a descendant of a Visconti, and it was the threats of the latter that forced Ludovico's children to escape, certainly not those of their own father.
 Galeazzo Sanseverino, after a few years spent at the imperial court of Innsbruck, moved in 1504 to France where he entered into the good graces of Louis XII, even becoming Grand Squire of France, and he was still in France in 1506, while in the series he is shown in Florence and still in the service of Ludovico Sforza.
 Ludovico Sforza's last attempt to reconquer Milan dates back to the early months of 1500, before his incarceration in the castle of Loches. The attempts of Galeazzo Sanseverino and even of the Emperor Maximilian I of Habsburg, both relatives of him, to mediate with the king of France to obtain his release were vain. Therefore, the gonfaloniere Soderini could have done nothing and indeed his intervention was never requested.

Other historical liberties 

 The beard was absolutely not fashionable in those years in Italy, nor would it have become so before the first decade of the 1500s. It was indeed a symbol of mourning, therefore almost none of the historical characters shown in the series, at least during the years preceding such date, ever wore a beard.
 The earrings, which we see many female characters from the series wearing, were in fact not at all fashionable at the end of the 15th century. Indeed, they were the prerogative of women of Eastern origin, such as the Greeks of Venice, and courtesans.
 The "Palazzo Sforza", where the ducal family is shown living in the series, does not actually exist. The main residence of the Dukes of Milan was the Castello Sforzesco and if there was a palace it was that of the Arengo, where Ludovico's father, Francesco Sforza, lived. By the time of Il Moro, however, the court had already moved into the castle and the Palazzo dell'Arengo was used as offices, where among other things Leonardo himself held a workshop.
 On the coat of arms located at the gates of the Castello Sforzesco one can see the imperial eagle and the Visconti viper as in the time of Ludovico il Moro. This is anachronistic in 1506, since at the time Milan was under the French and there should have been the coat of arms of Louis XII, including the Visconti viper and the French Fleur-de-lis.
 Among Verrocchio's pupils and collaborators there were Lorenzo di Credi (who inherited the workshop), Sandro Botticelli, Perugino, Domenico Ghirlandaio and Filippino Lippi; however, none of them is named, replaced in the series by fictional pupils.

See also
 Leonardo (2011 TV series)
 Cultural depictions of Leonardo da Vinci
 Personal life of Leonardo da Vinci

References

External links
Official website on raiplay.it
 
Leonardo on FilmAffinity.
 Leonardo - Aidan Turner - First Look

2021 Italian television series debuts
2020s Italian drama television series
2020s British drama television series
2020s French drama television series
2020s Spanish drama television series
RAI original programming
France Télévisions television dramas
La 1 (Spanish TV channel) network series
Television series about the history of Italy
Television series set in the 15th century
Works about Leonardo da Vinci
Television shows set in Florence
Depictions of Leonardo da Vinci on television
Cultural depictions of Michelangelo
Television series by Sony Pictures Television